The 1964 Illinois Fighting Illini football team represented the University of Illinois in the 1964 Big Ten Conference football season. Led by fourth-year head coach Pete Elliott, the Fighting Illini compiled an overall record of 6–3 with a mark of 4–3 in conference play, tying for fourth place in the Big Ten.

Dick Butkus played center and linebacker for Illinois from 1962 through 1964. During the 1964 season, Butkus was a unanimous pick for the 1964 College Football All-America Team, was named the American Football Coaches Association Player of the Year, finished third in Heisman Trophy balloting (a remarkable achievement for a lineman), and was selected as the team's most valuable player.

Schedule

Team players in the NFL

Dick Butkus was also drafted by the Denver Broncos in the 1965 American Football League Draft.

Awards and honors
Dick Butkus, unanimous All-American
Dick Butkus, American Football Coaches Association Player of the Year
Dick Butkus, third in Heisman Trophy balloting
George Donnelly, All-American defensive back
Jim Grabowski, All-American running back
Archie Sutton, All-American guard

References

Illinois
Illinois Fighting Illini football seasons
Illinois Fighting Illini football